The Guder is a river of central Ethiopia. It is a tributary of the Abay or Blue Nile on the left side; tributaries of the Guder include the Dabissa and the Taranta. The Guder River has a drainage area about 7,011 square kilometers in size.

A Greek resident built the first bridge over the Guder in 1897.

See also
 List of rivers of Ethiopia

Notes

Rivers of Ethiopia
Tributaries of the Blue Nile